The 1934 Santa Barbara State Roadrunners football team represented Santa Barbara State during the 1934 college football season.

Santa Barbara State competed in the Southern California Conference (SCC). The Roadrunners were led by first-year head coach Theodore "Spud" Harder and played home games at Peabody Stadium in Santa Barbara, California. They finished the season with a record of two wins, five losses and one tie (2–5–1, 0–4 SCIAC). Overall, the team was outscored by its opponents 31–91 for the season. The Roadrunners were shutout four times, and failed to score more than a touchdown in 7 of the 8 games.

Schedule

Notes

References

Santa Barbara State
UC Santa Barbara Gauchos football seasons
Santa Barbara State Roadrunners football